Veronika Pavlovna Pepelyaeva (born 3 August 2001) is an inactive Russian tennis player.

Pepelyaeva has a career-high WTA doubles ranking of 483, achieved on 31 December 2018. She has won two doubles titles on tournaments of the ITF Women's Circuit.

Pepelyaeva made her main-draw debut on WTA Tour at the 2019 Baltic Open where she received a wildcard for the doubles competition, partnering Anastasia Tikhonova.

ITF Circuit finals

Doubles: 4 (2–2)

References

External links
 
 

2001 births
Living people
Russian female tennis players
21st-century Russian women